Hôpital Saint Joseph des Soeurs de la Croix or the Hospital of Saint Joseph of the Sisters of the Holy Cross is a private, non-profit medical institution in Dora, Lebanon.  It is a residency hospital for the students of the Université Saint-Joseph and the Lebanese University medical schools. The hospital serves the heavily populated northern suburbs of Beirut.

History 
The Blessed Père Jacques founded the hospital in 1952 after he had founded the Congrégation des Soeurs Franciscaines de la Croix du Liban which played a major role in helping victims of World War I in Lebanon.  The hospital continues to be managed by the Sisters of the Holy Cross and adheres to the ethics of the Lebanese law and the Pontifical Council for Pastoral Assistance to Health Care Workers.

Hospital campus 
The main entrance of the hospital is on Rue Hôpital Saint Joseph. The emergency entrance is on Rue Raymond et Aïda Najjar.  The hospital consists of three main buildings, BLOC A: Le Centre Médical Raymond et Aïda Najjar, BLOC B: Le Pavillon Hospitalier, and BLOC C: Bloc Technique.

References

1952 establishments in Lebanon
Hospital buildings completed in 1952
Organisations based in Beirut
Hospitals in Lebanon
Hospitals established in 1952